The Winslow Mail was formerly a newspaper in Winslow, Arizona, United States. It was published from 1894 to 2007. In 1926, the name of the newspaper changed to Winslow Daily Mail until 1932, when it changed to The Winslow Mail. It remained The Winslow Mail until 1965, when it changed to Winslow Mail.

References

External links 
 https://newspaperarchive.com/us/arizona/winslow/winslow-mail/
 https://www.nhonews.com/news/2007/nov/12/last-issue-of-the-winslow-mail/
 https://www.nhonews.com/news/2004/feb/18/winslow-mail-and-reminder-welcomes-new-management/
 https://chroniclingamerica.loc.gov/lccn/sn84024937/

Newspapers published in Arizona